Okhtyrka was a military aviation training air base in Ukraine located 8 km east of Okhtyrka city in Sumy Oblast. Operated by the Soviet Air Forces and then the Ukrainian Air Force, it was home to the 809th Aviation Training Regiment, flying 102 L-39C aircraft.

The base ceased operations in 2004.

References 

http://www.weathergraphics.com/tim/russia/Akhtyrka.htm Tim Vasquez, Russian Airfields

Soviet Air Force bases
Ukrainian airbases